Ian Scheckter (born 22 August 1947 in East London, South Africa, and educated at Selborne College) is a former racing driver. He participated in 20 Formula One World Championship Grands Prix, debuting on 30 March 1974.  He scored no championship points.

Biography
The elder brother of 1979 Formula One champion Jody Scheckter and uncle of IRL racer Tomas Scheckter, his first F1 races were in the South African Grand Prix, first driving a Lotus 72 for locals Team Gunston in 1974. The following year and also in 1976, he drove a Tyrrell 007 for Lexington Racing, either side of a couple of European outings for Williams.

In domestic racing Scheckter came close to ending the run of Dave Charlton of titles in the South African National Drivers Championship in 1975, but in his two spells as a full-time competitor dominated the championship winning 49 races and equalling John Love and Charlton's tally of 6 championships.

Securing enough funds for a full season with the March works F1 team in 1977, he turned in some poor performances, aided in great part by the fact that, in some races, Team March had up to five drivers signed; lacking resources to provide adequately for them all. This situation spelled the end of his F1 career.  Scheckter's final grand prix would have been the 1977 Japanese Grand Prix but he was detained and then expelled from Japan due to only having a tourist visa in his South African passport and Japanese objections to the South African apartheid regime.

Complete Formula One World Championship results 
(key)

See also
List of select Jewish racing drivers

References

1947 births
Living people
Alumni of Selborne College
Hesketh Formula One drivers
March Formula One drivers
South African Formula One drivers
South African Jews
South African people of British-Jewish descent
South African racing drivers
Team Gunston Formula One drivers
Williams Formula One drivers